Old Stone Tavern is a historic home and tavern located at Moorefield, Hardy County, West Virginia. The original fieldstone section was built in 1788.  Attached to it are three frame sections added about 1840, 1860, and 1900, and a cinder block apartment built in the 1950s.  It features a front porch.  It was built by early resident Thomas Parsons and is one of the earliest buildings in Moorefield.

It was listed on the National Register of Historic Places in 1979.

References

Drinking establishments on the National Register of Historic Places in West Virginia
Houses completed in 1788
Houses in Hardy County, West Virginia
Houses on the National Register of Historic Places in West Virginia
National Register of Historic Places in Hardy County, West Virginia
Stone houses in West Virginia
1788 establishments in Virginia